The International Journal of Uncertainty, Fuzziness and Knowledge-Based Systems was founded in 1993 and is published bimonthly by World Scientific. It covers research on methodologies for the management of uncertainty. Topics include expositions on methods such as Bayesian and probabilistic methods, nonstandard logic, as well as applications, such as in image processing, conflict resolution, and databases. The journal does not publish papers on pure fuzzy mathematics, such as fuzzy topology or fuzzy algebra.

Abstracting and indexing 
The journal is abstracted and indexed in:
 Science Citation Index Expanded
 ISI Alerting Services
 CompuMath Citation Index
 Current Contents/Engineering, Computing & Technology
 ACM Guide to Computing Literature
 Mathematical Reviews
 Inspec
 Zentralblatt MATH
 Compendex

References 

Computer science journals
Publications established in 1993
World Scientific academic journals
English-language journals
Bimonthly journals